Elsinoaceae is a family of sac fungi, widely distributed in the tropics. A poorly known family, it includes some species that been identified as economically significant plant pathogens, in particular of citrus.

References

Myriangiales
Dothideomycetes families